Doğukan Sönmez (born 1 January 1992) is a professional Turkish basketball player. He is 2.09 m tall and plays center. He lastly played for Lokman Hekim Fethiye Belediyespor.

Formerly, he played in Dostluk Spor in Bakırköy, Istanbul.

References

External links
TBLStat.net Profile

1993 births
Living people
Centers (basketball)
Fethiye Belediyespor players
Galatasaray S.K. (men's basketball) players
Merkezefendi Belediyesi Denizli Basket players
Petkim Spor players
Turkish men's basketball players